Angel Luis Figueroa Otero (29 August 1929 – 20 May 1953) was a Puerto Rican boxer. He competed in the men's bantamweight event at the 1952 Summer Olympics. A year later, he died fighting for the United States in the Korean War.

1952 Summer Olympics
Figueroa fought in the men's bantamweight event at the 1952 Summer Olympics representing Puerto Rico. He defeated Tiến Vình, representing Vietnam, on points in his opening bout. He was eliminated in his next fight - on points - by František Majdloch, of Czechoslovakia.

Personal life
Figueroa served as a private in the 223rd Infantry Regiment, United States Army during the Korean War. He was killed in action at the Punchbowl on 20 May 1953. He was buried at the Puerto Rico National Cemetery in Bayamón, Puerto Rico.

References

1929 births
1953 deaths
Puerto Rican male boxers
Olympic boxers of Puerto Rico
Bantamweight boxers
Boxers at the 1952 Summer Olympics
People from Santurce, Puerto Rico
American military personnel killed in the Korean War
United States Army personnel of the Korean War
United States Army soldiers
Puerto Rican Army personnel
Olympians killed in warfare